Andrew John Jukes (5 November 1815 in Bombay – 4 July 1901 in Southampton) was an English theologian.

Background
The son of Andrew Jukes and his wife Georgina Ewart, he was educated at Harrow School and Trinity College, Cambridge.

Career
He was initially a curate in the Church of England at St. John's Church, Hull, but became convinced of Baptist teaching and underwent adult baptism at the George Street Chapel, Hull, on 31 August 1843. After leaving the Church of England, he joined the Plymouth Brethren.

Jukes later left the Plymouth Brethren and founded an independent chapel in Hull. Among those influenced by Jukes was Hudson Taylor.

Works
 Types in Genesis - Adam, Cain and Abel, Noah, Abraham, Isaac, Jacob, Joseph.
 The Characteristic Differences of the Four Gospels
 The Names of God
 The Law of the Offerings - on Leviticus
 (The Second Death and the) Restitution of All Things - arguments for universal salvation after resurrection
 The Mystery of the Kingdom - typology in I and II Kings.
 The New Man and the Eternal Life
 Catholic Eschatology Examined - A Reply to the Rev. H. N. Oxenham
 The Way Which Some Call Heresy - against infant baptism in the Book of Common Prayer
 The Church of Christ
 The Drying up of the Euphrates, and the Kings of the East - against an identification with the Ottoman Empire.
 Try the Spirits - a defence of the Trinity
 Letters of Andrew Jukes - edited by Herbert H. Jeaffreson 1903
 A Letter to a Friend on Baptism

References

External links
 
 Online Writings

English theologians
1815 births
1901 deaths
People educated at Harrow School
Alumni of Trinity College, Cambridge
People from Kingston upon Hull
19th-century English Anglican priests